Zhangfang Town is a rural town in Liuyang City, Hunan Province, People's Republic of China. As of the 2015 census it had a population of 31,800 and an area of 
. It borders Daweishan Town in the north, Paibu Town in the east, the towns of Yonghe, Guandu and Dahu in the west, and Xiaohe Township in the south.

Administrative division
The town is divided into seven villages and two communities, the following areas:

 Shanghong Community
 Zhangjiafang Community
 Baishi Village
 Chalin Village
 Fuxi Village
 Tianxi Village
 Jiangkou Village
 Chenqiao Village
 Renxi Village

Geography
The Xiaoxi River, a river in eastern Liuyang that rises in the town and discharges to Zhushuqiao Reservoir.

The Banli Reservoir is situated at the southwest of the town.

Economy
The economy is supported primarily by farming and ranching.

Education
 Zhangfang Middle School

Language
Mandarin is the official provincial language and local people speak Hakka Chinese.

Transportation

Railway
The Haoji Railway, from Uxin Banner of Inner Mongolia to Ji'an of Jiangxi, through the town.

Expressway
The Changsha–Liuyang Expressway, from Changsha, running through the towns of Dongyang, Jiaoxi, Gugang, Sankou, Yonghe, Guandu to Jiangxi.

Provincial Highway
The Provincial Highway S309, which heads west to Jiangxi and east to Changsha, runs through the town.

Attractions
Honglian Temple is a Buddhist temple in the town.

Chen Zhenren Temple is a Taoist temple in the town.

The Former Residence of Wang Shoudao and the Former Residence of Li Bai are famous scenic spots in the town.

Notable people
 Li Bai (spy), a famous spy of the Communist Party of China.
 Wang Shoudao, a politician who served as Governor of Hunan, Minister of Transport and CPPCC Committee Chairman of Guangdong.
 Zhang Fan, lieutenant general in the People's Liberation Army.

References

Divisions of Liuyang
Liuyang